Eucalyptus conspicua, commonly known as Gippsland swamp-box, is a species of small tree that is endemic to southeastern Australia. It has rough, thick, fibrous bark from the trunk to its small branches, lance-shaped to curved adult leaves, flower buds in groups of seven, white flowers and conical or hemispherical fruit. The crown of the tree is composed of a dull bluish-green juvenile, intermediate and adult leaves.

Description
Eucalyptus conspicua is a tree with rough, thick, fibrous bark on the trunk to its small branches. The crown of the tree is dull bluish green and includes juvenile, intermediate and adult leaves. Flowering occurs between January and May and the flowers are white.

Taxonomy and naming
Eucalyptus conspicua was first formally described in 1991 by Lawrie Johnson and Ken Hill and the description was published in the journal Telopea. The specific epithet (conspicua) is a Latin word meaning "visible" or "prominent", referring to the distinctive glaucous colour of the tree, making it stand out from other vegetation in its habitat.

Distribution and habitat
Gippsland swamp-gum grows in poorer soils, especially on hillsides or on damp heathy flats. It occurs south from Eden in New South Wales to Genoa in Victoria.

References

conspicua
Myrtales of Australia
Flora of New South Wales
Flora of Victoria (Australia)
Trees of Australia
Plants described in 1991
Taxa named by Lawrence Alexander Sidney Johnson
Taxa named by Ken Hill (botanist)